Harbor Boat Building Company was a shipbuilding company on Terminal Island in San Pedro, California. To support the World War II demand for ships General Engineering built: minesweepers, torpedo boats, submarine chasers, and air-sea rescue boats. In 1919 Romolo Rados founded Harbor Boat Building. After the war he renamed the company Harco Shipyard and built and sold a standard design motor boat. In 1959 he sold the company to LTV. The shipyard was closed and the company was sold again in 1971 to Omega-Alpha, Inc. The last ship built was in 1965 for the US Navy. The shipyard was located at 263 Wharf St, San Pedro.

Adjutant-class minesweeper
Harbor Boat Building Company built s, an auxiliary motor minesweepers for the United States Navy and other counties in the 1950s. Armed with two  Oerlikon cannons anti-aircraft (AA) guns.

Pipit-class coastal minesweeper
Harbor Boat Building Company built Pipit-class coastal minesweepers. Armed with two .30 cal (7.62 mm) machine guns. Built: , .

Yard patrol boat

Harbor Boat Building Company built two yard patrol boats, YP-617 and YP-618. Finished as reefer ships, small refrigerated cargo vessels to supply fresh food to small islands in the South Pacific. Over 250 tons of refrigerated cargo could be carried in ten wood and four steel refrigerated wells. The ship housed three officers and twenty men. The ships were converted to tuna ships after the war. They were armed with three 20 mm AA gun mounts and propelled by a single propeller creating .

Air-sea rescue boat
They had a crew of 7 or 8 and were armed with two .50 cal. M2 Browning machine guns. The boats had two rigid  United States Rubber Company bullet sealing fuel tanks. They were a speed boat used to rescue pilots, crew and passengers from downed aircraft in search and rescue, air-sea rescue missions.

Submarine chaser
Harbor Boat Building Company built submarine chasers that were of the  design. They had a crew of 28. The sub chasers were powered by two  General Motors, Electro-Motive Division, 16-184A diesel engines, and two propellers. They were armed with one Bofors 40 mm gun, two Browning M2 .50 cal. machine guns, two depth charge projector "Y guns", and two depth charge tracks. Some of the submarine chasers were lent to Allies of the United States as part of the Lend-Lease program.

Motor Torpedo Boat
 
Harbor Boat Building Company built Motor Torpedo Boats (BPT) in 1943. The BPTs were armed with two  torpedoes, one 20 mm gun and two .303 cal Vickers machine guns. Power was from three  Packard W-14 M2500 gasoline engines with three shafts. Built for the US Navy as BPT boats, they were reclassified to HM MTB for the use as British Motor Torpedo Boats.

Notable incidents
 SC 723 hull# 152, a  US Navy sub chaser sank in a typhoon on its way to Taiwan on August 27, 1948. She was commissioned as the USS PC-723 on December 7, 1942.

See also
California during World War II
Maritime history of California
 Wooden boats of World War 2
Cryer & Sons

References

American Theater of World War II
1940s in California
American boat builders